Frederic Bayley Pratt (22 February 1865 – 3 May 1945) was an American heir, the president of the board of trustees of Brooklyn's Pratt Institute for 44 years, from 1893 to 1937, and president of the United States Olympic Committee in 1910.

Early life
Frederic Pratt was born at his family's Clinton Hill estate in Brooklyn, New York, the son of Standard Oil magnate Charles Pratt and his second wife, Mary Helen Richardson.  He was brother to George Dupont Pratt, Herbert L. Pratt, John Teele Pratt, Harold I. Pratt, and their sister Helen Pratt (1867–1949); his older half-brother was Charles Millard Pratt.

After attending private schools, Pratt graduated from Amherst College in 1887.

Career
In 1893, he was elected president of the board of Pratt Institute, taking over from his elder brother, Charles Millard Pratt. Because founder Charles Pratt Sr died so soon after the college began, Frederic Pratt is credited with guiding the college through its early decades.  He served in this post for 44 years, after which his son Charles Pratt became president.

In 1910, Pratt succeeded Caspar Whitney as president of the American Olympic Committee, now the United States Olympic Committee, but served for only five weeks. Col Robert Means Thompson was selected to lead the organization.  In 1932, Pratt was awarded the Brooklyn Heights Neighborhood Club Annual Award for distinguished service to the cultural and civic life of the borough.

Personal life

On 17 October 1889, he married Caroline Ames Ladd (3 September 1861, Portland OR - 12 June 1946, Glen Cove), the daughter of William S. Ladd and Caroline Elliott. They had three children:
 Charles Pratt (1892- ), President of the Board of Pratt Institute from 1937-1953
 Mary Caroline Pratt (1895-1980), who married attorney Christian Herter. He later served as Governor of Massachusetts (1953-1956), and Secretary of State (1959-1961).
 Helen Ladd Pratt (1899-1972), who became Helen Ladd Pratt Emmett.

Pratt commissioned Charles A. Platt to design the family county estate, known as "Poplar Hill", in Glen Cove, on the North Shore of Long Island. Since 1971 it has been owned and operated by Glengariff Healthcare Center.

Pratt commissioned a family home at 229 Clinton Avenue, Brooklyn, designed by noted New York architect Henry F. Kilburn. It was originally known as the "Frederic B. Pratt House" (it is now known as the Caroline Ladd Pratt House). It was completed in 1898 in a neo-Georgian style. The family donated the property to the Pratt Institute.

Pratt died May 3, 1945 at his family home in Glen Cove, aged 81, of a heart ailment. He was survived by his wife, who died a year later, and grown children.

References

1865 births
1945 deaths
Philanthropists from New York (state)
Amherst College alumni
People from Clinton Hill, Brooklyn
People from Glen Cove, New York
Charles Pratt family
Presidents of the United States Olympic Committee
Pratt Institute people